The Bx1 and Bx2 are two bus routes that run on the Grand Concourse in the Bronx, New York City. The routes, which are operated by the MTA Regional Bus Operations, also follow Sedgwick Avenue and Mosholu Parkway for a short distance at their northern end. As the numbers suggest, these were the first two bus routes in the Bronx.

Route description and service
Except at their extreme northern and southern ends, the Bx1 and Bx2 share the same alignment. The only differences are:
In Mott Haven (southern end), the Bx2 turns east at Hostos Community College and then runs along 149th Street to serve some of the shopping district between there and Third Avenue, then turning south onto Courtlandt Avenue, which ends at Third Avenue and 146th Street, allowing the Bx2 to continue to operate down Third Avenue toward 136th Street, while the Bx1 continues down Grand Concourse. 
In Kingsbridge Heights (northern end), only the Bx1 continues down into Riverdale along 231st Street, though some early morning Bx2 cut-ins and early Sunday AM service also serves this segment.

The Bx1 and Bx2 bus routes share the majority of their alignment from the Grand Concourse and 149th Street north along the Concourse and Mosholu Parkway and west along Sedgwick Avenue to Heath Avenue on the west side of the Jerome Park Reservoir. At their ends, a divergence occurs as noted above.

Until August 2008, when permanent traffic changes were enacted in Mott Haven at 149th Street, Melrose/Willis Avenues, and Third Avenue, the Bx2 turned east off of the Grand Concourse at 165th Street and ran down Melrose Avenue to 149th Street.

Along the way, connections to the New York City Subway can be made at:
 Third Avenue–138th Street
 138th Street–Grand Concourse (Bx1 only)
 Third Avenue–149th Street (Bx2 only)
 149th Street–Grand Concourse
 161st Street–Yankee Stadium
 Bedford Park Boulevard
 Mosholu Parkway
 231st Street (Bx1 and some weekday southbound and Sunday-morning Bx2 buses)

As of September 2010, the Bx1 operates as a limited-stop service during the daytime on weekdays and Saturdays, while the Bx2 serves as the local. Before September 2010, both routes had a limited-stop variant.

History
Concourse Bus Line, Inc. was incorporated in early July 1921 by Major Emit Leindorf, deputy police commissioner in charge of motor transport under Mayor Hylan. The company soon began operating on the Grand Concourse as part of Hylan's "emergency bus lines". The Third Avenue Railway obtained an injunction against the operation on early March 1923, leading the city to assign two franchises to the company in mid-April, from Grand Concourse and Mosholu Parkway south to Fifth Avenue (Harlem, Manhattan) and Melrose Avenue and 150th Street (The Hub, Bronx). Along with a route to the Rockaways, the Concourse service was one of only two of Hylan's lines unaffected by a July 1923 injunction, since they had franchises, but were discontinued anyway by September 1924 due to the failure of the five-cent fare to pay the costs.

The franchises were reassigned to the Fifth Avenue Coach Company, which began operating the routes on October 11, 1924, for ten cents. (The Manhattan line had been truncated to 138th Street in the Bronx.) On September 14, 1927, the routes (Bx1 and Bx2 respectively) were again reassigned to the Surface Transportation Corporation, the bus subsidiary of the Third Avenue Railway, as two of its initial twelve routes. In April 1928, the original terminus was at Moshulu Parkway.

The bankrupt Surface Transportation Corporation's routes were taken over by Fifth Avenue Coach Lines in 1956, and the New York City Transit Authority subsidiary Manhattan and Bronx Surface Transit Operating Authority acquired all of the Fifth Avenue Coach routes in 1962.

Southbound Bx2 service originally ran via Third Avenue between East 161st Street and The Hub-East 150th Street until July 1974. Some Bx2 trips also ran via Paul Avenue and Bedford Park Boulevard in both directions until July 1974, when the Bx1 took over this role. The original northwestern terminus of the Bx1 was at Broadway and 231st Street. The Bx1 was extended to Riverdale at West 246th Street in February 1984, and was later cut back to its current terminus in 1990 after the Bx7 started running all times except nights. Some Bx1 trips also ran via Paul Avenue and Bedford Park Boulevard in both directions until March 1993.

Limited-Stop service was introduced to the Bx1 on February 23, 1993 as a weekday rush hour-only service.  Initially, it would have been implemented in January. This service improvement was put into place as part of the Fare Deal Ridership Growth Program. The change resulted in an increase in ridership. In July 1994, the Board approved a plan to expand the hours of limited-stop service to operate continuously between 6:30 a.m. and 7 p.m., and to introduce Bx2 limited-stop service, to go into effect in September 1994. In March 1995,  all Sunday Bx1 service began running via the Grand Concourse north of Bedford Park Boulevard. Between 10 a.m. and 6 p.m. alternate buses had run along Paul Avenue and West 205th Street. This branch was underutilized, serving fewer than ten passengers, and the split in service underserved the Grand Concourse. Limited-stop service was eventually extended to run weekdays and Saturdays in September 1996.

On September 8, 2002, the Bx1 and Bx2 were extended to a new terminal at Lincoln Avenue and 138th Street. The Bx1 had terminated at the 138th Street–Grand Concourse subway station, while the Bx2 had terminated at East 150th Street-Melrose Avenue near the Third Avenue–149th Street subway station.

Bx2 service ran along East 165th Street and Melrose Avenue until August 2008, when all buses started running at East 149th Street and Third Avenue.

On September 12, 2010, the Bx2 limited-stop service was eliminated, with all Bx2 buses running as locals. In addition, all Bx1s on weekdays between 6 a.m. and 6:30 p.m. and on Saturdays between 10 a.m. and 6 p.m. began operating as limiteds.

See also
 IND Concourse Line, the subway line that runs along Grand Concourse.

References

External links

 

X001
X001
Transportation in the Bronx
Vehicles introduced in 1921